John Willie Chester was a professional rugby league footballer who played in the 1900s and 1910s. He played at club level for Warrington (Heritage № 149), as a forward (prior to the specialist positions of), during the era of contested scrums.

Playing career

Challenge Cup Final appearances
John Willie Chester played in Warrington's 5-9 defeat by Huddersfield in the 1913 Challenge Cup Final during the 1912–13 season at Headingley Rugby Stadium, Leeds, in front of a crowd of 22,754.

Notable tour matches
John Willie Chester played as a forward, i.e. number 13, in Warrington's 10-3 victory over Australia in the 1908–09 Kangaroo tour of Great Britain tour match during the 1908–09 season at Wilderspool Stadium, Warrington, Saturday 14 November 1908, in front of a crowd of 5,000, due to the strikes in the cotton mills, the attendance was badly affected, the loss of earnings meant that some fans could not afford to watch the first tour by the Australian rugby league team.

Club career
John Willie Chester made his début for Warrington on 19 September 1908, and he played his last match for Warrington on 5 April 1915.

References

External links
Search for "Chester" at rugbyleagueproject.org

Place of birth missing
Place of death missing
Rugby league forwards
Warrington Wolves players
Year of birth missing
Year of death missing